Elshad Isgandarov (born May 21, 1972) - Azerbaijani politician, former Chairman of State Committee for Work with Religious Organizations of Azerbaijan Republic.

Elshad Isgandarov was born on May 21, 1972 in Baku. He graduated from the faculty of History of Baku State University with honor in 1993. He received MA degree in international affairs from the University of Columbia, USA (2002-2004).

In 1993-1995 he was editor of the History journal of the Azerbaijan National Academy of Sciences. In 1995 he was one of the co-founders of the National Assembly of Youth Organizations of the Republic of Azerbaijan. Later he was deputy chairman of the National Assembly. From 1999 he worked at the Ministry of Foreign Affairs of the Republic of Azerbaijan. In 2000-2005 he was the First Secretary at the Permanent Mission of the Republic of Azerbaijan to the UN. On March, 2009 he received the rank of Ambassador Extraordinary and Plenipotentiary under the decree of the President of the Republic of Azerbaijan. On May 31, 2012 Amb. Iskandarov was appointed Chairman of the State Committee on Religious Associations of the Republic of Azerbaijan.

He speaks fluently Azerbaijani (native), English and Russian languages as well as Arabic language in intermediate level.

See also
Cabinet of Azerbaijan

References

1972 births
Living people
Politicians from Baku
Government ministers of Azerbaijan
Columbia University people
Baku State University alumni